Bury Metropolitan Borough Council elections are generally held three years out of every four, with a third of the council being elected each time. Bury Metropolitan Borough Council, generally known as Bury Council, is the local authority for the metropolitan borough of Bury in Greater Manchester, England. Since the last boundary changes in 2022, 51 councillors have been elected from 17 wards.

Political control
From 1889 to 1974, Bury was a county borough, independent of any county council. Under the Local Government Act 1972 it had its territory enlarged and became a metropolitan borough, with Greater Manchester County Council providing county-level services. The first election to the reconstituted borough council was held in 1973, initially operating as a shadow authority before coming into its revised powers on 1 April 1974. Greater Manchester County Council was abolished in 1986 and Bury became a unitary authority. Political control of the council since 1973 has been held by the following parties:

Leadership
The leaders of the council since 2002 have been:

Council elections
1998 Bury Metropolitan Borough Council election
1999 Bury Metropolitan Borough Council election
2000 Bury Metropolitan Borough Council election
2002 Bury Metropolitan Borough Council election
2003 Bury Metropolitan Borough Council election
2004 Bury Metropolitan Borough Council election (whole Metropolitan Borough Council elected after boundary changes increased the number of seats by 3)
2006 Bury Metropolitan Borough Council election
2007 Bury Metropolitan Borough Council election
2008 Bury Metropolitan Borough Council election
2010 Bury Metropolitan Borough Council election
2011 Bury Metropolitan Borough Council election
2012 Bury Metropolitan Borough Council election
2014 Bury Metropolitan Borough Council election
2015 Bury Metropolitan Borough Council election
2016 Bury Metropolitan Borough Council election
2018 Bury Metropolitan Borough Council election
2019 Bury Metropolitan Borough Council election
2021 Bury Metropolitan Borough Council election
2022 Bury Metropolitan Borough Council election (new ward boundaries)

By-election results

References

External links
Bury Council
By-election results 

 
Local government in the Metropolitan Borough of Bury
Elections in the Metropolitan Borough of Bury
Council elections in Greater Manchester
Metropolitan borough council elections in England